Glen Gauntt (born July 23, 1978) is a former American football quarterback who played six seasons in the Arena Football League with the Carolina Cobras, Dallas Desperados, Georgia Force, Las Vegas Gladiators, Nashville Kats, Philadelphia Soul and Orlando Predators. He played college football at the University of South Florida and attended Booker High School in Sarasota, Florida. He was also a member of the Augusta Stallions and Mahoning Valley Thunder of the af2.

References

External links
Just Sports Stats
College stats

Living people
1978 births
Players of American football from Florida
American football quarterbacks
South Florida Bulls football players
Augusta Stallions players
Carolina Cobras players
Dallas Desperados players
Georgia Force players
Nashville Kats players
Las Vegas Gladiators players
Mahoning Valley Thunder players
Philadelphia Soul players
Orlando Predators players
Sportspeople from Sarasota, Florida